Klymivka is a village in the Poltava Raion of the Poltava Oblast of Ukraine.

Geography 
A drying stream with a dam flows through the village.

History 
The village was founded in the mid-18th century. The earliest recorded mention of the village was in 1775, when it was referred to as the "Klimovka suburb at the Bronyevskaya mill" (Original: ""). In the 18th century, the settlement belonged to the  territory.

It later became part of the Konstantinogradsky Uyezd of the Poltava Governorate in the Russian Empire. In 1885, the village's population was 1827 people and there were 364 farmsteads, an Orthodox church, school, chapel,  27 windmills, and 2 fairs a year.

According to the 1897 census, the population grew to 2,722 (1,351 males and 1,371 females), of whom 2,715 were Orthodox.

The village was part of the Karlivka Raion before the district merged with the Poltava Raion in 2020.

Notable people 
 Tamara Hundorova  - Ukrainian literary critic and culturologist

References 

Commons category link is on Wikidata
Villages in Poltava Raion